Events from the year 1794 in art.

Events
 English painter Thomas Birch comes to the United States to assist his artist father, William Birch, in preparing a 29-plate collection of engravings entitled Birch's Views of Philadelphia, eventually published in 1799.

Works

 William Blake – The Ancient of Days
 Louis-Léopold Boilly – The Triumph of Marat
 Giuseppe Ceracchi – Alexander Hamilton (marble portrait bust)
 John Singleton Copley – Admiral of the Fleet Howe
 Jean-Pierre Norblin de La Gourdaine – The Hanging of Traitors in Effigy
 Johann Friedrich Dryander
 Portrait du citoyen Laboucly, inspecteur de la viande
 Portrait de Dominique Joseph Garat
 Portrait du général Jourdan et de son adjutant
 John Flaxman – The Fury of Athamas (marble group; completed)
 Thomas Jones – Classical Landscape with a River
 Angelica Kauffman
 Portrait of the Impromptu Virtuoso Teresa Bandettini-Landucci of Lucca
 Self-portrait of the Artist hesitating between the Arts of Music and Painting
 Thomas Lawrence
 Catherine Rebecca Gray, Lady Manners
 Portrait of a Young Lady, known as Pinkie
 Jean-Baptiste Regnault – La Liberté ou la Mort ("Liberty or Death"; original lost)
 Gilbert Stuart – Portrait of John Jay
 George Stubbs – Baronet, with Samuel Chifney

Births

 March 26 – Julius Schnorr von Carolsfeld, German painter (died 1872)
 May 13 – Louis Léopold Robert, Swiss painter (died 1835)
 June 3 – William Charles Ross, British painter of historical paintings, miniatures and portraits (died 1860)
 June 23 – Franz Nadorp, German painter who primarily worked and lived in Rome (died 1876)
 July 24 – Robert William Sievier, English engraver, sculptor and inventor (died 1865)
 August 29 – Léon Cogniet, French historical and portrait painter (died 1880)
 September 17 – Henry Wyatt, English portrait painter (died 1840)
 September 30 – Carl Joseph Begas, German historical painter (died 1854)
 October – Thomas Griffiths Wainewright, English painter, art critic, forger and probable serial poisoner (died 1847)
 October 19 – Charles Robert Leslie, English genre painter (died 1859)
 November 19 – James Stark, English painter (died 1859)
 December 31 – Samuel Jackson, English watercolour and oil painter (died 1869)
 date unknown
 Ferdinand Deppe, German naturalist, explorer and painter (died 1861)
 Abel Dimier, French sculptor (died 1864)
 Joseph Patrick Haverty, Irish painter (died 1864)
 William Heath, English satirical engraver (died 1840)
 Jan Feliks Piwarski, Polish painter and professor of art (died 1859)
 Johannes Baptista van Acker, Flemish portrait miniature painter (died 1863)

Deaths
 April 4 – Hendrik-Jozef Antonissen, Dutch landscape painter (born 1737)
 April 14 – Samuel Hieronymus Grimm, Swiss watercolour painter (born 1733)
 May 13 – Pierre-François Brice, Belgian painter (born 1714)
 June 11 - Christoph Friedrich Reinhold Lisiewski, German portrait painter (born 1725)
 June 24 – Rosalie Filleul, French painter (born 1752)
 August 11 - Christian Ulrik Foltmar, Danish wallpaper weaver, painter of miniatures and organist (born 1716)
 October – Jean Humbert, Dutch portrait painter (born 1734)
 December 11 – Étienne Ficquet, French engraver (born 1719)
 date unknown
 Vicente Calderón de la Barca, Spanish historical painter (born 1762)
 François Boch, ceramicist, co-founder of Villeroy & Boch (born 1695)
 Carl-Ludwig Christinek, Russian painter (born 1730/1732)
 Philippe Curtius, wax modeller (born 1737)
 Giacomo Leonardis, Italian engraver and etcher (born 1723)
 Jacopo Marieschi, Italian vedute painter (born 1711)

References

 
Years of the 18th century in art
1790s in art